Henrik Hallenberg Hansen (born 28 July 1979) is a Danish former professional football midfielder. He was most recently the manager of Danish Superliga club SønderjyskE.

Club career
Hansen joined AC Horsens in the winter of 2007 and made an immediate impact on the team. AC Horsens, until then known as a defensive team with little offensive force was added much creativity with Hansen, and during his first year in the club he scored 11 Danish Superliga goals. On 18 December 2007, his performance was rewarded with a call-up for the Danish national football team.

Hansen has previously played for Næstved IF, Esbjerg fB and SønderjyskE. On 14 July 2008, Hansen signed a -year contract with OB.

Coaching career
Hansen ended his career at SønderjyskE in June 2015 and was immediately hired as a 'A+ coach': a coach who is responsible for the talent setup out in their respective clubs. Hansen was promoted to the first team management in January 2017, as an assistant manager to Claus Nørgaard.

In April 2018 it was confirmed, that Hansens would join OB as an assistant manager from the beginning of the new 2018-19 season. In December 2021, Hansen was appointed new manager at his former club, SønderjyskE. He signed a contract until June 2024. He did not manage to save the club from relegation, and in the following season the club' results were inconsistent, and he was sacked in November 2022.

References

External links
National team profile
Career statistics at Danmarks Radio

1979 births
Living people
Danish men's footballers
Denmark under-21 international footballers
Esbjerg fB players
SønderjyskE Fodbold players
AC Horsens players
Odense Boldklub players
Danish Superliga players
Association football midfielders
Danish football managers
SønderjyskE Fodbold managers